Holland Roden is an American actress. She is known for her roles as Lydia Martin in MTV's teen drama series Teen Wolf, Zoe Woods in Syfy's horror anthology series Channel Zero: Butcher's Block, Bridget Cleary in Amazon Prime Video's horror anthology documentary series Lore and as Erin Isaacs in the horror film No Escape.

Early life
Roden was born in Dallas, Texas, where she attended Hockaday School, an all-girls private school. She came from a medical family and majored in molecular biology and women's studies at UCLA, and spent three and a half years in pre-medical education with a view to becoming a cardiothoracic surgeon before taking up acting full time.

Career
Roden starred in the HBO comedy series 12 Miles of Bad Road playing Bronwyn. In 2008, she played Emily Locke in Lost and Sky in the film Bring It On: Fight to the Finish. Between 2008 and 2010, she appeared in guest roles on television series including CSI: Crime Scene Investigation, Cold Case, Weeds, Community, Grey's Anatomy, and Criminal Minds.

Beginning in 2011, Roden starred in the MTV teen supernatural drama Teen Wolf, where she played Lydia Martin, a popular, intelligent girl at Beacon Hills High School who eventually discovers that she possesses the supernatural abilities of a banshee. In 2016, it was announced at San Diego Comic-Con that Teen Wolf would end in 2017 after the completion of its sixth season.

On May 25, 2017, Roden was cast as the lead in the third season of Syfy's horror anthology series Channel Zero, titled Butcher's Block. She portrayed Zoe Woods, a young woman who struggles with mental illness. The show premiered on February 7, 2018. On May 31, 2017, Roden was cast as the lead in the Amazon Prime Video horror anthology series Lore, in which she played the role of Bridget Cleary. Lore premiered on October 13, 2017.

On September 12, 2018, Roden was cast in horror film No Escape, which was directed, produced and written by Will Wernick; the film was released on September 18, 2020. In March 2019, Roden was cast as Sienna in Jane the Novela, a spin-off of Jane the Virgin. The spin-off was not picked up by the network. On October 18, 2019, Roden was cast in Escape Room: Tournament of Champions, the sequel to the 2019 psychological thriller film Escape Room; the sequel was released on July 16, 2021. On July 30, 2021, Roden was cast in the independent film The Re-education of Molly Singer.

In September 2021, it was announced that a reunion film forTeen Wolf had been ordered by Paramount+, with Jeff Davis returning as a screenwriter and executive producer of the film. The majority of the original cast members, including Roden, were set to reprise their roles. The film was released on January 26, 2023.

Personal life
On May 17, 2019, Roden was detained by Brazilian officers at the São Paulo–Congonhas Airport, in São Paulo, Brazil. Immigration officials denied her entry into the country on the grounds that she had an invalid Brazilian visa. Roden claimed to have been treated as a criminal, and that the authorities also denied food and water to her, despite her having presented a valid passport and visa. After about 24 hours of detention, she was allowed to enter the country. She criticized the rigorous way she was treated: "After two years of traveling to Brazil with this passport and this visa with no problems, to meet fans and make friends, I am taken aback by the accusations and the treatment that faced me from the Brazilian police today. I am shocked that this is the same Brazil I know and love."

Filmography

Film

Television

Music videos

Podcast

Awards and nominations

References

External links

 
 

Living people
21st-century American actresses
Actresses from Dallas
American film actresses
American television actresses
University of California, Los Angeles alumni
Hockaday School alumni
Year of birth missing (living people)